Coelbren may mean: 

 Coelbren, Powys, a village in the south-west of the Brecon Beacons National Park in Wales 
 Coelbren y Beirdd, a supposed "druidic" alphabet invented by forger Iolo Morganwg (1747-1826)